Events from the year 1839 in Canada.

Incumbents
Monarch: Victoria

Federal government
Parliament of Upper Canada: 13th

Governors
Governor of the Canadas: Robert Milnes
Governor of New Brunswick: George Stracey Smyth
Governor of Nova Scotia: John Coape Sherbrooke
Commodore-Governor of Newfoundland: Richard Goodwin Keats
Governor of Prince Edward Island: Charles Douglass Smith

Events
February 15 – Chevalier DeLorimier and others who joined in the Rebellion are executed.
April 11 – Death of John Galt, novelist, one of the originators of the British American Land Company.
June 24 – Last meeting of the Committee of Trade, forerunner of the Board of Trade.
September 19 – Opening of the Albion Mines Railway in Nova Scotia, an early Canadian steam-driven mining railway
September 26 – Canadian rebels are transported to New South Wales.
October 19 – Charles Thomson, Governor of Upper and Lower Canada, arrives. It is determined that Upper and Lower Canada shall share revenue in the ratio of 2 to 3.

Full date unknown
Lord Durham's report recommends the establishment of responsible government and the union of Upper and Lower Canada to speed the assimilation of French-speaking Canadians.
Territorial disputes between lumbermen from Maine and New Brunswick lead to armed conflict in the Aroostook River valley (the Aroostook War).
First Horse Railway in Upper Canada.
Mount Allison University founded by Charles Frederick Allison in Sackville, New Brunswick.

Births
January 1 – Annie L. Jack, author
January 29 – Élie Saint-Hilaire, educator, farmer and politician (died 1888)
May 8 – Adolphe-Basile Routhier, judge, author and lyricist (died 1920)
May 31 – Louis-Alphonse Boyer, politician (died 1916)
October 8 – George Edwin King, jurist, politician and 2nd Premier of New Brunswick (died 1901)
September 17 – Antonin Nantel, priest, teacher, school administrator, and author (died 1929)
November 16 – Louis-Honoré Fréchette, poet, politician, playwright and short story writer (died 1908)

Full date unknown
Augustus F. Goodridge, politician and Premier of Newfoundland (died 1920)
James Colebrooke Patterson, politician, Minister and Lieutenant-Governor of Manitoba (died 1929)

Deaths
September 18 – Jeanne-Charlotte Allamand, pioneer, educator and artist (b. 1760 in Switzerland)

References

 
Years of the 19th century in Canada
Canada
1839 in North America